Cloud County Health Center is a medical facility located in Concordia, Kansas. The health center was founded as St. Joseph's Hospital in 1903 by the Nazareth Convent and Academy in Concordia (run by the Sisters of St. Joseph). In 1995, ownership was transferred from the Sisters of St. Joseph to Salina Regional Health Center (Salina, Kansas), and the name was then changed to the Cloud County Health Center.

Services
The hospital offers a range of services including an on-site laboratory licensed in accordance with the Clinical Laboratory Improvement Act, emergency services, intensive care, pharmacy, and other health-related services. The health center is a participating Medicare and Medicaid provider.

Plans
The health center plans to build a new hospital to replace the aging existing buildings. The plan to construct a new $20-million hospital, and acquire $5 million in new equipment, was announced in November 2007.

Board of directors
The CCHC Board of Directors is made up of 11 members: four officers, and seven members.
 Officers

 Suzy Tuggle - President
 Richard Kueker, OD  - Vice President
 JoAnne Balthazor - Treasurer
 Pam Campbell - Secretary

 Members

 Joel Figgs
 John Gisselbeck
 Christy Hasch
 Renea Gernant
 Ryan McMillan
 Steve Palmquist
 Sister Beth Stover

Board of Trustees
The CCHC Board of Trustees is made up of 12 members, four as officers, and eight as members.
 Officers

 Dr. Monte Wentz - Chairman
 Eric Andersen - Vice Chairman
 Charles Zimmerman - Treasurer
 S. Christy Hasch - Secretary

 Members

 Kurt Kocher
 Dr. Greg Hattan
 Dr. Justin Poore
 Mike Lamm
 Todd Leif
 Scott Seifert
 Phil Gilliland
 Traci Ferrell

References

Buildings and structures in Cloud County, Kansas
Hospitals in Kansas
Catholic hospitals in North America